Darrin Earl Chiaverini (born October 12, 1977) is an American football assistant coach and former wide receiver. He played college football at Colorado. He was drafted in the fifth round (148th overall) of the 1999 NFL Draft by the Cleveland Browns.

During his career, he also played for the Dallas Cowboys and Atlanta Falcons of the National Football League (NFL). He was formerly the special teams coordinator and outside wide receivers coach for Texas Tech prior to joining the Colorado coaching staff.

Early years
Chiaverini attended Corona High School. As a sophomore, he made 20 receptions for 340 yards and 2 touchdowns, receiving All-league honors. As a junior, he had 70 receptions for 1,116 yards and 10 touchdowns, with 4 interceptions while playing free safety. He received All-league, All-county and All-CIF honors.

As a senior in 1994, he led the state of California in receptions with 88, to go along with 1,188 receiving yards, 10 receiving touchdowns, 30 carries for 330 rushing yards and 3 rushing touchdowns playing occasionally at slotback. He helped the team achieve a 9–3 record, winning the Mountain View League title before losing in the state 4A semifinals. He earned USA Today honorable-mention All-American, All-Mountain View League, All-Riverside County, All-CIF and All-state honors. He finished his prep career 178 receptions for 2,698 yards and 22 touchdowns.

Chiaverini also played baseball, batting a .415 average with 25 stolen bases, while earning All-league and All-county honors as a junior. Growing up he played both ice hockey and roller hockey.

On October 13, 2010, he was inducted into the Corona High School Hall of Fame.

College career
Chiaverini accepted a football scholarship from the University of Colorado. As a sophomore, he appeared in 11 games as a backup, tallying 7 receptions for 61 yards. He had a break-out game in the 1996 Holiday Bowl, making 7 catches for 94 yards and one touchdown.

As a junior, he played in 11 games (9 starts), ranking second on the team with 35 receptions for 461 yards.

As a senior, he led the team with 52 receptions for 630 yards and 5 touchdowns. He finished his college career with 97 receptions (seventh in school history), 1,199 receiving yards and 6 touchdowns. In 1998, he won the inaugural Buffalo Heart Award given to the Colorado Buffalo player that best "demonstrates grit, determination and toughness."

During Chiaverini's tenure, Colorado had two 10-win seasons. The Buffaloes won three bowl games during this time: the 1996 Cotton Bowl, the 1996 Holiday Bowl, and 1998 Aloha Bowl. Chiaverini was team captain for the Buffs in 1998.

Professional career

Cleveland Browns
Chiaverini was selected by the Cleveland Browns in the fifth round (148th overall) of the 1999 NFL Draft, who were returning to the NFL as an expansion team following the original team's 1996 relocation to Baltimore. He appeared in 16 games and started 8 contests in place of an injured Leslie Shepherd. He ranked fifth among NFL rookies with 44 catches (fifth-highest by a rookie in club history) and sixth with 487 yards (sixth-highest by a rookie in club history), to go along with four touchdowns. He holds the Browns' record for most catches by a rookie in a game with 10 receptions (for 108 yards and a touchdown) against the Jacksonville Jaguars.

In 2000 his performance regressed, playing in 10 games (2 starts) and missing 6 contests with a lingering knee injury. He finished with only 8 receptions for 68 yards and one touchdown. He suffered a concussion in the season opener and saw limited action before returning to start games against the Steelers (9/17) and Raiders (9/24). He was declared inactive in 6 of the last 8 weeks due to a knee injury.

Dallas Cowboys
On August 28, 2001, he was traded to the Dallas Cowboys in exchange for a conditional seventh round draft choice (not exercised). He was mostly used as the third receiver, recording 10 receptions for 107 yards and two touchdowns, He was released on June 13, 2002.

Atlanta Falcons
On July 2, 2002, he was signed as a free agent by the Atlanta Falcons. A quadriceps injury limited him to seven games and no receptions during the season, while being declared inactive in 9 games. After not being re-signed, he finished his NFL career with 62 catches for 662 yards and seven touchdowns.

Austin Wranglers (AFL)
In 2004, Chiaverini was signed by the Austin Wranglers of the Arena Football League (AFL). While there, he accrued 213 receptions for 1,944 yards and 33 touchdowns for the Austin Wranglers.

Coaching career

Junior college
Chiaverini began his coaching career in 2007 as the wide receiver coach for Mt. San Antonio College. In 2008, he was promoted to co-offensive coordinator.

In January 2010, Chiaverini was hired  by Riverside City College (RCC) as associate head coach, co-offensive/special teams/recruiting coordinator. He helped Riverside to a 10–1 record and a Central Division Championship during the 2010 season. The Riverside Tigers defeated Los Angeles Harbor College in the Central Division Championship Bowl in November 2010. RCC was 1–9 in 2009 and the 10–1 record in 2010 marked one of the biggest turnarounds in junior college football history.

In 2011, RCC recorded a perfect 11–0 record, snapping Mt. San Antonio College's 26 game win streak. Riverside College went on to capture back to back Central Division Championships and was ranked #1 in Southern California in the final poll conducted by the California Community College Athletic Association/CCCFCA Football Poll (11/13/2011). Riverside concluded their season with a 31–14 win over Saddleback College in the Golden State Bowl (11/19/2011). RCC led the nation in scoring offense and set two school records, averaging 49.6 points per game while scoring 64 touchdowns.

In 2013, Riverside's offense accrued 6,399 total yards, another school record. Additionally, Riverside's special teams ranked near the top in multiple categories since Chiaverini's arrival and have blocked a school record 22 kicks in four seasons as well as having had one of the top punt return units in the nation leading the conference in punt return yards three out of four seasons. Also in 2013, Riverside returned a school record three kickoff returns for touchdowns.

Chiaverini also served as the recruiting coordinator for the school. Riverside transferred 42 players to Division I (NCAA) schools from 2010 to 2013. Riverside went 40–5 over those four seasons and won three conference titles and four Bowl Championships and 24 consecutive home wins. Chiaverini also served as the special teams coordinator in the East-West Shrine Game under former NFL Head Coach Jerry Glanville in 2013 and 2014 for the East Team.

Division I
In 2009, Chiaverini was the assistant special teams coach under Frank Gansz, Jr. for the UCLA Bruins. UCLA's special teams ranked among the best in the Pacific-10 Conference in 2009. UCLA went on to defeat Temple 30–21 in the 2009 EagleBank Bowl in Washington, D.C.

On January 16, 2013, Chiaverini was named the special teams coordinator for Texas Tech, becoming the first full-time special teams coach at the school since 2009. In 2014 Texas Tech improved from last in the conference in Net Punting in the Big 12 Conference in 2013 to 2nd in the Conference in 2014 with a 42.2 Net Average. Texas Tech also Ranked 2nd in Kickoff Coverage in 2014 with a net average of 40 yards with Oklahoma and Kansas St. During the 2014 season, Kicker Ryan Bustin set the school record for field goals made with 50. Texas Tech was also plus three in the NCAA in +/- ratio in 2014 on Special Teams. In 2015, Chiaverini was named the outside wide receivers coach in addition to his special teams duties. In 2015, Chiaverini was one of 30 coaches in the NCAA selected to the NFL-NCAA Coaches Academy in Louisville, Kentucky. In 2015 Texas Tech's Special Teams ranked 12th in the nation in Special Teams Efficiency according to ESPN. Ranking was based on the point contributions of each unit to team's scoring margin, on per play basis. ESPN ranked Texas Tech's offense second in the nation in Offensive Efficiency. Texas Tech's offense set a school record in 2015 with 596 points scored breaking the previous record set in 2008. Texas Tech's offense finished 2nd in the NCAA in scoring (46.6 points per game) and total offense 594.5 yards per game). Wide Receiver / Kick Returner Jakeem Grant was 5th in the nation in Kickoff Return yards with 1017 yards and tied a school record with two kickoff returns for touchdowns in 2015. Grant garnered 2nd team All-America honors from the Associated Press, Sports Illustrated and CBS and was named Big 12 Special Teams Player of the Week twice in 2015. Freshman placekicker Clayton Hatfield ranked 8th in the nation and 1st in the Big-12 in Field Goal Percentage 87.5%. Punter Taylor Symmank finished his career in the top two in school history with over 43 yards per punt. Texas Tech did not have a field goal or punt blocked during the 2014 and 2015 seasons.

In December 2015, Chiaverini departed Texas Tech for his alma mater Colorado after being named co-offensive coordinator, receivers coach and recruiting coordinator.

In 2016, Chiaverini helped lead the biggest turnaround in school and Pac-12 history when Colorado improved from 1–8 in conference play in 2015 to 8–1 in 2016 winning the Pac-12 South Championship. Colorado improved from 4–9 in 2015 to 10–3 in 2016. Serving as co-offensive coordinator / wide receivers coach, Colorado had a record breaking year on offense. The records including: total offense (5,802), first quarter points (120), offensive plays (1,037), red-zone opportunities (55), 500-plus yard games of total offense (6 tied), first downs (310), Pac-12 Offensive Players-of-the-Week (4).

Colorado's biggest improvement was in points scored. In 2015 Colorado scored 320 points. In 2016 Colorado scored 427 points in an increase of 107 points. Colorado also scored 50 offensive touchdowns in 2016, an improvement from 38 in 2015.

It was also the first time in school history to have a quarterback throw for 300 yards and rush for 100 yards in a game. Colorado accomplished this feat twice. Quarterback Steven Montez passed for 333 yards and three touchdowns, and rushed for 135 yards and another touchdown in Colorado's win against Oregon. Montez was named Pac-12 Player-of-the-Week. Quarterback Sefo Liufau passed for 345 yards, and rushed for 108 yards and a touchdown against Washington State. Liufau was named Pac-12 Player-of-the-Week and CBS National Player of the Week. Only four quarterbacks achieved the feat of throwing for 300 and rushing for a 100 in a game in 2016.

Chiaverini also served as recruiting coordinator for the Buffaloes and in 2017 Coachingsearch.com reported that Colorado had the most improved recruiting class in the nation as they improved 32 spots to have the 35th ranked recruiting class in the country according to 247sports.com. Scout.com reported that Colorado had a Top 30 class nationally and was their highest-ranked class in over a decade. Chiaverini was instrumental in landing Colorado another top-35 recruiting class in 2020.

On February 12, 2020, Chiaverini was named the interim head coach at Colorado following the departure of Mel Tucker, who left for Michigan State the night before.

He continues to be nationally recognized as a top recruiter; Rivals.com has now named him one of the top 25 recruiters in the country for the last three recruiting classes (2018, 2019 and 2020).
 
The 2020 Buffaloes, the second time where he called the bulk of the plays (along with the 2018 season), everyone was faced with all kinds of challenges due to the COVID-19 pandemic.  But despite those challenges and mounting injuries, CU showed tremendous improvement in several areas in the shortened six-game season.  The Buffs finished in the top five in conference games in 11 major statistical categories for 2020, compared to just three in 2019), most notably second in total offense, scoring offense, rushing offense and sacks allowed, as well as first in third down conversions. 
 
In addition, tailback Jarek Broussard was the first CU player to be named the Pac-12’s offensive player of the year, and Sam Noyer was the first quarterback to earn first- or second-team all-conference honors since Koy Detmer was first-team in 1996 (Noyer was second-team by the league coaches).

On November 28, 2021, Chiaverini was fired as offensive coordinator. During the 2021 season, he guided a Buffaloes offense that finished with one of the worst seasons in school history.

During Chiaverini’s tenure as Coordinator at Colorado they had 9 Offensive Pac-12 Players of the Week (Most in School History). In 2018 Colorado had another 1st when WR LaViska Shenault went over a 1000 yards receiving (1011 yards 11 touchdowns) and RB Travon McMillan went over 1000 yards rushing (1,009 yards 7 touchdowns) in the same season. Coached QB Steven Montez to finish 2nd in CU history in total offense (7,648 yds), 3rd all-time in CU career TD passes (46), and 4th all- time in CU career passing yards (6,841)
Set school record for a junior with 19 passing TDs in a single season.

Chiaverini was hired in March 2022 by UCLA Head Coach Chip Kelly as an Offensive Analyst.

Personal life
Chiaverini resides in Redondo Beach, California , with his wife Shannon and their two children. In 2005, he was cast in the film The Longest Yard.

His father Ed was an original member of the surf rock band “The Lively Ones” in the early 1960s.

References

External links
 
 Colorado coach bio
 Boulder Sound: Darrin Chiaverini is back making noise with the Buffaloes
 Colorado player bio
 Atlanta Falcons bio

1977 births
Living people
American football wide receivers
Atlanta Falcons players
Austin Wranglers players
Cleveland Browns players
Colorado Buffaloes football coaches
Colorado Buffaloes football players
Dallas Cowboys players
Mt. SAC Mounties football coaches
New Mexico Highlands University alumni
Players of American football from California
Riverside City Tigers football coaches
Sportspeople from Corona, California
Sportspeople from Orange County, California
Texas Tech Red Raiders football coaches
UCLA Bruins football coaches